Slovenia was represented by Platin in the Eurovision Song Contest 2004 with the song "Stay Forever".

Platin is a Slovenian music duet consisting of Simon Gomilšek and Diana Lečnik. They married in Turkey, while they were representing Slovenia in Eurovision Song Contest 2004.

Before Eurovision

EMA 2004 
EMA 2004 was the 9th edition of the Slovenian national final format Evrovizijska Melodija (EMA). The competition was used by RTV Slovenija to select Slovenia's entry for the Eurovision Song Contest 2004. The 2004 edition of EMA consisted of five shows: four semi-finals and a final. The competition was broadcast on TV Slovenija 1 and online via the broadcaster's website rtvslo.si.

Format 
Thirty-two songs competed in five televised shows consisting of four semi-finals on 11 January, 18 January, 25 January and 1 February 2004 and a final on 15 February 2004. Eight songs competed in each semi-final with a four-member expert jury and public televoting selecting four finalists out of the eight songs to proceed to the final. The televote selected the first three finalists and the jury selected the fourth finalist. The jury consisted of Jernej Vene (music editor for Radia Slovenija), Martin Žvelc (musician, composer and music producer), Branka Kraner (singer) and Alen Steržaj (musician). In the final, the winner was selected over two rounds of voting. In the first round, the 50/50 combination of points from a five-member expert jury and public televoting selected three finalists out of the sixteen competing songs to proceed to a superfinal. In the superfinal, public televoting exclusively determined the winner.

Competing entries 
Artists and composers were able to submit their entries to the broadcaster between 5 October 2003 and 28 November 2003. 83 entries were received by the broadcaster during the submission period. An expert committee consisting of Alen Steržaj, Martin Žvelc, Darja Švajger (singer, vocal coach and 1995 and 1999 Slovenian Eurovision entrant) and Armando Šturman (guitarist) selected thirty-two artists and songs for the competition from the received submissions. The competing artists were announced on 11 December 2003. Among the competing artists was former Slovenian Eurovision contestant Regina who represented Slovenia in 1996.

Semi-finals 
Four semi-finals took place on 11 January, 18 January, 25 January and 1 February 2004 at the RTV Slovenija Studio 1 in Ljubljana, hosted by Peter Poles and Bernarda Žarn. In each semi-final eight entries competed, with the entries first facing a public vote where the top three proceeded to the final, and a jury panel then selecting an additional entry out of the remaining five to proceed.

Final 
The final of EMA 2004 took place on 15 February 2004 at the Gospodarsko razstavišče in Ljubljana, hosted by Miša Molk while Peter Poles and Bernarda Žarn hosted segments from the green room. In addition to the performances of the competing entries, 2003 Slovenian Eurovision entrant Karmen Stavec performed as a guest. The winner was selected over two rounds of voting. In the first round, the combination of points from a five-member jury panel and a public vote three entries to proceed to the second round. The jury consisted of Daniela Tami (Head of the Swiss delegation at the Eurovision Song Contest), Karolina Gočeva (singer and 2002 Macedonian Eurovision entrant), Manuel Ortega (singer and 2002 Austrian Eurovision entrant), Drago Ivanuša (composer and musician) and Lara Baruca (singer). In the second round, a public vote selected "Stay Forever" performed by Platin as the winner.

Controversy
Like in many previous editions of EMA, the public televote and the jury awarded conflicting scores. This caused some controversy, because the strongest televote favorite Natalija Verboten, received 0 points from the jury. Similarly, Bepop in 2003, Karmen Stavec in 2002, and Tinkara Kovač in 1999 were also televote favourites. These entries usually came 2nd, or failed to qualify for the semi-finals, because the points awarded by the jury outweighed the points they received from the televotes. The controversy resulted in the 2005 EMA scores basing solely on the results of the televote.

At Eurovision
For the Eurovision Song Contest 2004, a semi-final round was introduced in order to accommodate the influx of nations that wanted to compete in the contest. Because Slovenia placed 23rd at the 2003 contest, country was forced to compete in the first Eurovision semi-final, held on 12 May 2004. They performed 16th, following Macedonia and preceding Estonia. It finished on second last 21st place with only 5 points, failing to qualify to the Grand Final. Therefore, Slovenia had to compete in the semi-final again in ESC 2005.

Voting

Points awarded to Slovenia

Points awarded by Slovenia

References

External links 
 EMA 2004

2004
Countries in the Eurovision Song Contest 2004
Eurovision